Igor Alekseyev (Игорь Алексеев, born ) is a Russian male former weightlifter, who competed in the middle heavyweight class and represented Russia at international competitions. He later emigrated to Australia and competed for them after 1994.. He won the gold medal at the 1995 World Weightlifting Championships in the 91 kg category. He participated at the 1996 Summer Olympics in the 91 kg event.

References

External links
 

1972 births
Living people
Russian male weightlifters
Australian male weightlifters
World Weightlifting Championships medalists
Place of birth missing (living people)
Olympic weightlifters of Russia
Weightlifters at the 1996 Summer Olympics
Russian emigrants to Australia